"Broken Hearted Savior" is the most successful song by American rock band Big Head Todd & the Monsters.  It was released as the second single from their major label debut album Sister Sweetly in 1993, reaching number nine on the Billboard Album Rock Tracks chart. A black and white music video was made featuring the band playing the song in a basement.

"Broken Hearted Savior" was featured on the soundtrack to the 2006 motion picture Southland Tales.

1993 songs
1993 singles
Big Head Todd and the Monsters songs
Giant Records (Warner) singles